Time and Love: The Music of Laura Nyro is a 1997 tribute album to singer-songwriter Laura Nyro, released shortly after her death of ovarian cancer and released on Astor Place.

Almost all of the artists recorded Nyro's songs. The exception was Jane Siberry, who contributed an original song which combined her own tribute to Nyro with a brief medley of several of her songs.

Track listing
Phoebe Snow, "Time and Love" – 4:34
Jill Sobule, "Stoned Soul Picnic" – 4:07
Suzanne Vega, "Buy and Sell" – 3:17
Rosanne Cash, "Save the Country" – 3:14
Jane Siberry, "When I Think of Laura Nyro" – 4:28
Beth Nielsen Chapman, "Stoney End" – 3:53
Lisa Germano, "Eli's Comin'" – 4:27
The Roches, "Wedding Bell Blues" – 3:21
Sweet Honey in the Rock, "And When I Die" – 2:54
Patty Larkin, "Poverty Train" – 4:25
Jonatha Brooke, "He's a Runner" – 3:55
Holly Cole, "Sweet Blindness" – 5:22
Leni Stern, "Upstairs By a Chinese Lamp" – 4:51
Dana Bryant, "Woman's Blues" – 6:10

Laura Nyro tribute albums
1997 compilation albums
Astor Place (label) albums